Cionn Caslach (anglicised as Kincasslagh) is a small Gaeltacht seaside village in the Rosses area of County Donegal, Ireland. Despite only having a population of just over 40 people, the village has attracted much international attention due to the success of local singer Daniel O'Donnell.

Name

The Irish and official name for Kincasslagh is Cionn Caslach or Ceann Caslach, which means head of the small inlet. Due to its status as a Gaeltacht village, all roadsigns to and in the village itself are in the Irish language.

Language
Kincasslagh is in the Gaeltacht region which means the official language of the area is Irish. However, the use of the language has been in decline since the 1950s. There are very few Irish-speakers in Kincasslagh today, much like neighbouring villages Mullaghduff and Burtonport.

History
Kincasslagh has a long history of emigration, much like the rest of West Donegal. In the 1950s and 1960s, a large number of locals left the area to work in countries such as the UK (England and especially Scotland), the USA and Australia.

Education
The local primary school is the Irish language Scoil Náisiúnta Béal na Cruite with 112 pupils, and the nearest secondary school is Rosses Community School in Dungloe.

Local amenities
There is only one public house in the village Iggy's, and the one grocery shop, The Cope, is part of a cooperative retail chain indigenous to the area. The Viking House is the nearest hotel to the village, which was once owned by singer Daniel O'Donnell. Kincasslagh is also the nearest village to Cruit Island, which boasts a very popular golf course.

Sport
The local Gaelic Athletic Association (GAA) team is Naomh Mhuire CLG which covers the greater Lower Rosses area. The local soccer team is Keadue Rovers.

Arts
Kincasslagh is probably best known for being the birthplace of singers Margo and Daniel O'Donnell. The village played host to Daniel's annual tea party which he held at his mother's home as part of the Donegal Shore Festival, which drew thousands of fans each year. The village was used as a location for the film American Women / The Closer You Get in 2000

Transport
Kincasslagh is situated five kilometres from Donegal International Airport. Kincasslagh Road railway station, five kilometres south, was open from 1913 until 1940 when the Derry and Lough Swilly Railway closed the line due to financial difficulties.

See also
 List of towns and villages in Ireland

References

Gaeltacht places in County Donegal
Gaeltacht towns and villages
The Rosses
Towns and villages in County Donegal